Currito of the Cross (Spanish:Currito de la Cruz) is a 1936 Spanish drama film directed by Fernando Delgado  and starring Antonio Vico, Elisa Ruiz Romero and José Rivero. The film was adapted from Alejandro Pérez Lugín's 1921 novel of the same title, set in the bullfighting world.

Cast
 Antonio Vico as Currito de la Cruz  
 Elisa Ruiz Romero as Rocío 
 José Rivero as Manuel Carmona  
 Antonio García 'Maravilla' as Ángel Romera 'Romerita'  
 Ana Adamuz as Manuela  
 Carmen Viance as Sor María  
 Eduardo Pedrote as Copita 
 Emilio Santiago as Gazuza  
 Ana de Leyva as Teresa  
 Francisca Campos as Dolores  
 Nicolás D. Perchicot as Padre Almanzor  
 Amparo Villegas as Madre Abadesa 
 Antonio Soto as Pollo  
 José Ortega as El Pintao

References

Bibliography
 Labanyi, Jo & Pavlović, Tatjana. A Companion to Spanish Cinema. John Wiley & Sons, 2012.

External links 

1936 films
1936 drama films
Spanish drama films
1930s Spanish-language films
Films based on Spanish novels
Films based on works by Alejandro Pérez Lugín
Films directed by Fernando Delgado
Spanish black-and-white films